Arab International Media Services is a media company in the United Arab Emirates.

It is a partner with Fujairah Investments the investment arm of the government of Fujairah in Fujairah Media, which is a media company with television, radio, publishing and service divisions.  This joint venture has been sponsored politically by Shaikh Hamad bin Mohammed Al Sharqi.

References

Mass media companies of the United Arab Emirates